This is a list of years in Serbia.

16th century

17th century

18th century

19th century

20th century

21st century

See also
 Timeline of Serbian history

 
Serbia history-related lists
Serbia